HMS Hesper was a British Royal Navy 18-gun ship-sloop of the , launched in 1809 at Dartmouth. Her original builder, Benjamin Tanner, became bankrupt during her construction, so John Cock completed her. In 1810 she was reclassed as a 20-gun sixth-rate ship (but without being re-armed); in 1817 she was again re-rated, this time as 26 guns. She served primarily in the Indian Ocean. In 1810 she participated in the Invasion of Isle de France. The next year Hesper participated in the capture of Java, which she followed in 1812 by capturing Timor. She was sold in 1817.

Service
G. Aklom commissioned Hesper in March 1807. However, Hesper was not launched until 1809 and did not enter service until 1809. Captain George Hoare was appointed to Hesper in 1809, commissioned her in August and sailed for the Indian Ocean on 9 October. In October 1810 Commander David Paterson took command.

Hesper captured Mouche No.28  on 15 November 1810 near Île Bonaparte (Réunion) as she was carrying dispatches to the Île de France. A boarding party in Hespers cutter suffered three men wounded while boarding Mouche; French casualties were two men killed and five wounded, one of whom was Mouche No.28s commander. The British recommissioned her for the attack on Île de France.

Hesper was detailed for service with the squadron under Admiral Albemarle Bertie engaged in the invasion of Isle de France (Mauritius). While she was there, she and the government armed ship Emma, Lieutenant B. Street commanding, performed a useful reconnaissance taking soundings at night of the anchorage on the coast, a service for which Bertie commended them. They identified a place in a narrow strait between an islet called the Gunner's Coin and the beach where the fleet could anchor and where boats could land through an opening in the reef. The island surrendered on 3 December. In September 1814 prize money was paid to the officers and crews of the vessels that had been present at the capture of Isle de France.

Following the successful invasion, Hesper was at the centre of a dispute between Admiral Bertie and Admiral William O'Bryen Drury whose commands overlapped. Bertie appointed Lieutenant Edward Lloyd to command Hesper and he sailed her back to Bombay with Major-General John Abercrombie and his staff as passengers. There Lloyd found out that Drury had appointed Barrington Reynolds to command her. Although Drury died before the dispute was settled, Reynolds was confirmed in command.

On 5 January 1811, Hesper was one of six ships that shared in the capture of Mouche. French records report that Mouche No.27 was captured on 12 January at the entrance to Port Napoléon (Port Louis, Île de France) by a British frigate flying the French flag.

Later in 1811, Hesper was attached to the squadron of Admiral Robert Stopford that captured Java.

On 31 August the frigates Nisus, President, and Phoebe, and Hesper were detached to take the seaport of Cheribon. Reynolds received a promotion to Post-captain, confirmed the next year, for his role. In 1847 the Admiralty authorized the issuance of the Naval General Service Medal with clasp "Java" to all remaining survivors of the campaign.

In February 1812 command passed to Charles Thomas Thurston, who was blown by a storm to Timor, which had been out on contact with Europe for two years. Thurston was able to persuade the Dutch garrison there to surrender and captured the island without fighting. Thurston was later invalided home. Lieutenant Henry Theodosius Browne Collier took command on 30 June 1812, but he too was invalided home before the confirmation of his promotion to Commander on 24 October 1812. Command then passed to Commander Joseph Prior. As a lieutenant, he had transferred to Hesper in 1809.

William Bland was Hespers surgeon while she was at Bombay, India. He became involved in a wardroom argument with Robert Case, the ship's purser, which resulted in a duel with pistols on 7 April 1813 in which Bland killed Case. He was convicted of Case's murder and sentenced to be transported to Australia.

In October Hesper was in the Persian Gulf, delivering despatches to Bushire for the British ambassador at Teheran. She then visited Abu Dhabi. Captain Charles Biddulph replaced Prior in August 1812 and served until 22 April 1815, when he died. Before he died 22 May 1815, aged 29, he charted the four Biddulph's Islands (or Biddulph Group), which lie on the Arabian side of the Persian Gulf.
  
Hesper was without a captain for a while and then on 20 September 1815 Michael Matthews was made Commander on Hesper. Commander Robert Campbell (acting) was his replacement.
 In 1816 Commander William Everard (acting) replaced Campbell.

Fate
Hesper was sold in 1817.

Notes, citations, and references

Notes

Citations

References

External links
 Michael Phillips' "Ships of the Old Navy"

Ships built in Dartmouth
Cormorant-class ship-sloops
1809 ships